A management information base (MIB) is a database used for managing the entities in a communication network. Most often associated with the Simple Network Management Protocol (SNMP), the term is also used more generically in contexts such as in OSI/ISO Network management model. While intended to refer to the complete collection of management information available on an entity, it is often used to refer to a particular subset, more correctly referred to as MIB-module.

Objects in the MIB are defined using a subset of Abstract Syntax Notation One (ASN.1) called  "Structure of Management Information Version 2 (SMIv2)" . The software that performs the parsing is a MIB compiler. 

The database is hierarchical (tree-structured) and each entry is addressed through an object identifier (OID).

ASN.1
Abstract Syntax Notation One (ASN.1) is a standard and flexible notation that describes data structures for representing, encoding, transmitting, and decoding data. It provides a set of formal rules for describing the structure of objects that are independent of machine-specific encoding techniques and is a precise, formal notation that removes ambiguities.

ASN.1 is a joint ISO and ITU-T standard, originally defined in 1984 as part of CCITT X.409:1984. ASN.1 moved to its own standard, X.208, in 1988 due to its broader applicability. The substantially revised 1995 version is covered by the X.680 standards series.

An adapted subset of ASN.1, Structure of Management Information (SMI), is specified for use in SNMP to define sets of related MIB objects; these sets are termed MIB modules.

MIB hierarchy
The MIB hierarchy can be depicted as a tree with a nameless root, the levels of which are assigned by different organizations. The top-level MIB OIDs belong to different standards organizations, while lower-level object IDs are allocated by associated organizations. This model permits management across all layers of the OSI reference model, extending into applications such as databases, email, and the Java reference model, as MIBs can be defined for all such area-specific information and operations.

A managed object (sometimes called a MIB object or object) is one of any number of specific characteristics of a managed device. Managed objects are made up of one or more object instances, which are essentially variables. An OID uniquely identifies a managed object in the MIB hierarchy.

Two types of managed objects exist: 
Scalar objects define a single object instance.
Tabular objects define multiple related object instances that are grouped in MIB tables.

An example of a managed object is atInput, which is a scalar object that contains a single object instance, the integer value that indicates the total number of input AppleTalk packets on a router interface.

SNMPv1 and SMI-specific data types
The first version of the Structure of Management Information (SMIv1) specifies the use of a number of SMI-specific data types, which are divided into two categories: simple data types and application-wide data types.

Simple data types
Three simple data types are defined in the SNMPv1 SMI: 
 The integer data type is a signed integer in the range of −231 to 231−1.
 Octet strings are ordered sequences of 0 to 65,535 octets.
 Object IDs represent object identifiers that are allocated according to the rules specified in ASN.1.

Application-wide data types
The following application-wide data types exist in the SNMPv1 SMI:
Network addresses represent addresses from a particular protocol family. SMIv1 supports only 32-bit (IPv4) addresses. SMIv2 uses Octet Strings to represent addresses generically, and thus are usable in SMIv1 too. SMIv1 had an explicit IPv4 address datatype.
Counters are non-negative integers that increase until they reach a maximum value and then roll over to zero. SNMPv1 specifies a counter size of 32 bits.
Gauges are non-negative integers that can increase or decrease between specified minimum and maximum values.
Time ticks represent time since some event, measured in hundredths of a second.
Opaques represent an arbitrary encoding that is used to pass arbitrary information strings that do not conform to the strict data typing used by the SMI.
Integers represent signed integer-valued information. This data type redefines the integer data type, which has arbitrary precision in ASN.1 but bounded precision in the SMI.
Unsigned integers represent unsigned integer-valued information, which is useful when values are always non-negative. This data type redefines the integer data type, which has arbitrary precision in ASN.1 but bounded precision in the SMI.

SNMPv1 MIB tables
The SNMPv1 SMI defines highly structured tables that are used to group the instances of a tabular object (that is, an object that contains multiple variables). Tables are composed of zero or more rows, which are indexed in a way that allows an SNMP manager to retrieve or alter an entire row with a single Get, GetNext, or Set command.

SMIv2
It enhances and adds to the SMIv1-specific data types, such as including bit strings, network addresses, and counters. Bit strings are defined only in SMIv2 and comprise zero or more named bits that specify a value. Network addresses represent an address from a particular protocol family. Counters are non-negative integers that increase until they reach a maximum value and then return to zero. In SMIv1, a 32-bit counter size is specified. In SMIv2, 32-bit and 64-bit counters are defined.

SMIv2 also specifies information modules, which specify a group of related definitions. Three types of SMI information modules exist: MIB modules, compliance statements, and capability statements. 
 MIB modules contain definitions of interrelated managed objects.
 Compliance statements provide a systematic way to describe a group of managed objects that must be implemented for conformance to a standard.
 Capability statements are used to indicate the precise level of support that an agent claims with respect to a MIB group. An NMS can adjust its behavior toward agents according to the capabilities statements associated with each agent.

Updating MIB modules 
MIB modules are occasionally updated to add new functionality, remove ambiguities and fix defects. This MIB module has since been split up and can be found in MIB modules such as  "Management Information Base for the Internet Protocol (IP)",  "Management Information Base for the Transmission Control Protocol (TCP)",  "Management Information Base for the User Datagram Protocol (UDP)",  "The Interfaces Group MIB" and  "Management Information Base (MIB) for the Simple Network Management Protocol (SNMP)".

Index 
There are a large number of MIBs defined by standards organizations like the IETF, private enterprises and other entities.

IETF maintained 
There are 318 RFCs in the first 5000 RFCs from the IETF that contain MIBs.  This list is a mere fraction of the MIBs that have been written:

SNMP - SMI:  — Defines the Structure of Management Information (SMI)
MIB-I:  — Historically used with CMOT, not to be used with SNMP
SNMPv2-SMI:  — Structure of Management Information Version 2 (SMIv2)
MIB-II:  — Management Information Base for Network Management of TCP/IP-based internets
SNMPv2-MIB:  — Management Information Base (MIB) for the Simple Network Management Protocol (SNMP)
TCP-MIB:  — Management Information Base for the Transmission Control Protocol (TCP)
UDP-MIB:  — Management Information Base for the User Datagram Protocol (UDP)
IP-MIB:  — Management Information Base for the Internet Protocol (IP)
IF-MIB:  — The Interfaces Group MIB
ENTITY-MIB:  — Entity MIB (Version 3)
ENTITY-STATE-MIB:  — Entity State MIB
ALARM-MIB:  — Alarm Management Information Base (MIB)
 Fibre Channel
FC-MGMT-MIB:  Fibre Channel Management MIB
FIBRE-CHANNEL-FE-MIB:  Definitions of Managed Objects for the Fabric Element in Fibre Channel Standard
HPR-IP-MIB:  — Definitions of Managed Objects for APPN/HPR in IP Networks

IEEE maintained 
The IETF and IEEE have agreed to move MIBs relating to IEEE work (for example Ethernet and bridging) to their respective IEEE workgroup.  This is in process and a few items are complete.
 Network bridge
 IEEE 802.1ap-2008 consolidated the IEEE and IETF RFCs related to bridging networks into eight related MIBs.
 Management Information Base (MIB) Modules / IEEE 802.1

References

External links 
 ByteSphere's MIB Database, a free online MIB repository for thousands of SNMP MIBs.
 SimpleWeb MIBs 
 .
 .
 ipMonitor's SNMP Center 
 MIB Depot  — extensive list of MIBs
 PEN (Private Enterprise Number) registry
 PEN request authority

MIB browsers 
 SnmpB: A graphical open source MIB browser for Windows, OSX and Linux.
 mbrowse: A graphical SNMP MIB browser for Linux, based upon GTK+ and Net-SNMP.
 BlackOwl MIB Browser: A graphical MIB browser for Windows and Linux which can extract MIBs from RFCs and display graphs.
 SMI-Mib Browser: A graphical MIB browser (as of 2010-05-18, this project is no longer under active development).
 MBJ: A graphical MIB browser, written in Java
 JMibBrowser: A graphical MIB browser, written in Java. It can send SNMP requests and dynamically load MIB data.
 JManager: An open-source SNMP manager, written in Java. Capable of importing MIBs, support for IPv6.
 qtmib: An open source graphical MIB browser written in C++. It is built as a front-end for Net-SNMP.
 iReasoning MIB Browser: A graphical MIB browser, written in Java. Load MIB files and issue SNMP requests, available on Windows, OS X and Linux.

Network management